Vasilyevsky is a rural locality (a khutor) in Mrakovsky Selsoviet, Kugarchinsky District, Bashkortostan, Russia. The population was 36 as of 2010. There are 4 streets.

Geography 
Vasilyevsky is located 5 km north of Mrakovo (the district's administrative centre) by road. Sultangulovo is the nearest rural locality.

References 

Rural localities in Kugarchinsky District